Global Video plc was a chain of British video rental stores that ceased trading in 2006. 

The chain's founder, Maq Rasul, was ranked among Scotland’s Richest Asians in a 2005 survey published by Sunrise Radio. His business had a number of rivals such as Blockbuster Video, Tesco DVD and LoveFilm. It subsequently went into administration and in June 2006, the last store closed.

See also
Blockbuster Video

References

Video rental services
Defunct retail companies of the United Kingdom
Scottish brands
Retail companies established in 1985
Retail companies disestablished in 2006
Entertainment companies established in 1985
Entertainment companies disestablished in 2006
Mass media companies established in 1985
Mass media companies disestablished in 2006
1985 establishments in Scotland
2006 disestablishments in the United Kingdom
Companies that have entered administration in the United Kingdom